Kalyana Galatta is a 1998 Indian Tamil-language comedy film written and directed by Rajkapoor, starring Sathyaraj, Mantra and Khushboo. The film, scored by Yuvan Shankar Raja, filmed by Rajarathinam and edited by B. Lenin and V. T. Vijayan, released on 1 August 1998.

Plot

Satyaraj is an orphan and he adopts a local Christian family, and becomes the guardian of the family. He comes to Ooty  searching for a job in a cinema theatre run by manivannan, where Xatyaraj's friend, S Ve Shekar also works. Due to some clever planning, Satyaraj convinces maNi and gets the job. But maNivaNNan wants only a married man to be his manager. Because Satyaraj is desperate, he lies that he is married and that his wife works as a post-women in Madras. He runs into petty fights with Manivannan's daughter Manthra, who plans underground tricks to sack Satyaraj from his job. Anandaraj is the "muRai paiyan " for Manthra, who wants to mzffy her for property. Due to one such prank from Manthra, Manivannan asks Satyaraj to ask his wife to come and collect his salary. Satyaraj then lies, that he is a widower and shows a photo of unknown figure Kushboo (supposed to have died), got from one of the local studios, as his wife.  While Satyaraj and S Ve shakhar do cleverly mastermind this plan, R Sundararajan a local interior designer(?) brings back Kushboo alive but mentally retarded to Satyaraj's place. Meanwhile, some astrologer predicts that Manthra should be married as a second wife, or else her "thaali" wouldn't last long and Manivannan, wants Satyaraj to marry her. Having a big fish in hand, Satyaraj tries to conceal Kushboo and marry Manthra. The second half goes in Kushboo's pranks and the duo's attempts in hiding her, who also turns out to be pregnant and making a fool of Manivannan. Finally, Satyraj is caught red-handed, and then he traces Kushboo's origin and discovers that she is the eldest daughter of his adopted family (so his sister!) and Anandaraj is the culprit who is her husband who deserted her, which made her insane. He doesn't have any evidence to prove this fact and finally director Raj Kapoor uses "ladies-sentiment" of pregnancy and pain to make Anandraj confess and the movie ends with wedding knots for Anandaraj-Kushboo and Satyaraj-Mantra.

Cast
 Sathyaraj as Rajagopalan
 Manthra as Pooja
 Khushbu as Jennifer/Gayathri
 S. Ve. Shekhar
 Manivannan
 R. Sundarrajan
 Vinu Chakravarthy
 K. R. Vatsala
 Anandaraj
 Fathima Babu as Commissioner's wife
 Mithun Chakraborty (cameo)

Soundtrack

The music, including soundtrack, was composed by Yuvan Shankar Raja. The soundtrack, featuring 6 tracks with lyrics written by Pazhani Bharathi and Ravi Bharathi, was released by 5 Star in 1998.

Reception
Indolink wrote "It reminds us of a dozen movies on the same lines produced earlier, and mentioning the names of those movies in the dialogues is a clever patch from the director".

References

External links
 
 Kalyana Galatta at CineSouth
 Listen to Kalyana Galatta songs at Hummaa!

1998 films
Indian comedy films
Films scored by Yuvan Shankar Raja
1990s Tamil-language films
Films directed by Raj Kapoor (Tamil film director)